State Road 143 (SR 143) is a State Road in the northern section of the U.S. state of Indiana. SR 143 was originally introduced in the late 1930s or early 1940 routed along its modern routing. The road was paved in the 1970s.

Route description
SR 143 begins at a four-way intersection with County Road 1650 West crossing north–south and County Road 550 North continues west from the western end of SR 143. The state road heads east passing the main entrance to Jasper-Pulaski Fish and Wildlife Area while passing through wooded area. The wooded area becomes farmland before SR 143 has a four-way intersection with US 421 about midway between Medaryville and San Pierre. The roadway continues east as County Road 550 North. The highest traffic count for SR 143 in 2014 was at its western end, where 295 vehicles travel the highway on average each day. The lowest traffic count during 2014 was at the eastern end of SR 143, where 264 vehicles travel the highway on average each day.

History 
The Indiana State Highway Commission added SR 143, along its modern routing, to the state road system between 1939 and 1941. The roadway was paved between 1972 and 1973. No major changes have occurred to SR 143 since it was paved.

Major intersections

References

External links

143
Transportation in Pulaski County, Indiana